Kuettlingeria is a genus of lichen-forming fungi in the family Teloschistaceae. The genus was originally circumscribed in 1857 by Italian botanist Vittore Benedetto Antonio Trevisan de Saint-Léon. The genus was resurrected in 2020 to include 14 species formerly in the Caloplaca xerica species group as well as C. cretensis and C. diphyodes.

Species

Kuettlingeria albolutescens 
Kuettlingeria areolata 
Kuettlingeria atroflava 
Kuettlingeria cretensis 
Kuettlingeria crozetica 
Kuettlingeria diphyodes 
Kuettlingeria emilii 
Kuettlingeria erythrocarpa 
Kuettlingeria furax 
Kuettlingeria fuscoatroides 
Kuettlingeria neotaurica 
Kuettlingeria percrocata 
Kuettlingeria soralifera 
Kuettlingeria teicholyta 
Kuettlingeria xerica 

Taxa formerly placed in Kuettlingeria:

Kuettlingeria elegantissima , = Stellarangia elegantissima
Kuettlingeria lallavei , = Kuettlingeria teicholyta
Kuettlingeria macquariensis , = Gondwania cribrosa
Kuettlingeria physcioides , = Dufourea physcioides
Kuettlingeria visianica , = Kuettlingeria teicholyta

References

Teloschistales
Teloschistales genera
Lichen genera
Taxa named by Vittore Benedetto Antonio Trevisan de Saint-Léon
Taxa described in 1857